Louise E. Weigel Atwill (August 26, 1912 in Buffalo, New York – December 1982 in Buffalo) was an American figure skater.  She competed in the Winter Olympic Games twice and twice won the ladies silver medal at the United States Figure Skating Championships.  Her younger sister, Estelle Weigel, also skated in the Olympics.

On October 9, 2018, Louise was inducted into the Greater Buffalo (NY) Sports Hall of Fame along with her sisters, Estelle and Mary.

Results

References
Sports-Reference.com

1912 births
1982 deaths
American female single skaters
Olympic figure skaters of the United States
Figure skaters at the 1932 Winter Olympics
Figure skaters at the 1936 Winter Olympics
20th-century American women
20th-century American people